Örenkaya can refer to:

 Örenkaya, Boğazkale
 Örenkaya, Sandıklı